Ryan Ramsay (born May 18, 1983) is a Canadian former professional ice hockey player.  He has previously played in the Deutsche Eishockey Liga (DEL) for the Krefeld Pinguine, DEG Metro Stars, Straubing Tigers, Kölner Haie and the Straubing Tigers. He was signed as a free agent to a one-year contract with Schwenninger Wild Wings on July 21, 2013., where he played for two seasons before retiring from his playing career.  He currently runs a hockey camp for boys.

References

External links

1983 births
Living people
Alaska Aces (ECHL) players
Canadian ice hockey centres
DEG Metro Stars players
Kitchener Rangers players
Kölner Haie players
Krefeld Pinguine players
Peoria Rivermen (AHL) players
Peoria Rivermen (ECHL) players
Peterborough Petes (ice hockey) players
Plymouth Whalers players
Schwenninger Wild Wings players
Straubing Tigers players
Worcester IceCats
Canadian expatriate ice hockey players in Germany